International Lady is a 1941 American spy-drama film directed by Tim Whelan and starring George Brent, Ilona Massey and Basil Rathbone.

During the production stage it was originally titled as G-Men versus Scotland Yard. It was released shortly before the entry of the United States into World War II.

Plot
An American operative in Great Britain (George Brent) and his counterpart from Scotland Yard (Basil Rathbone) suspect the beautiful singer Carla Nillson (Ilona Massey) of espionage.  As they cleverly unravel her technique of singing in code over the radio, they track her from London, to Lisbon, to New York, where they succeed in tying her to a wealthy candy manufacturer who is, in reality, the saboteur mastermind.

Cast
 George Brent as Tim Hanley
 Ilona Massey as Carla Nillson
 Basil Rathbone as Reggie Oliver
 Gene Lockhart as Sidney Grenner
 George Zucco as Webster
 Francis Pierlot as Dr. Rowan
 Martin Kosleck as Bruner
 Charles D. Brown as Tetlow
 Marjorie Gateson as Bertha Grenner
 Leyland Hodgson as Sergeant Moulton
 Clayton Moore as Sewell
 Gordon De Main as Denby
 Frederick Worlock as Sir Henry
 Jack Mulhall as Desk Clerk
 Ralph Dunn as Don
 Lillian Yarbo as Prissy (uncredited)

References

External links 
 

1941 films
American spy films
Films directed by Tim Whelan
Films set in England
Films set in Lisbon
Films set in London
Films set in New York City
World War II films made in wartime
World War II spy films
American black-and-white films
American war drama films
Films produced by Edward Small
United Artists films
1940s English-language films